Šentjakob ( or) is a settlement on the right bank of the Krka River in the Municipality of Šentjernej in southeastern Slovenia. The municipality is part of the traditional region of Lower Carniola. It is now included in the Southeast Slovenia Statistical Region.

References

External links
Šentjakob on Geopedia

Populated places in the Municipality of Šentjernej